Paranais is a genus of annelids belonging to the family Naididae.

The genus has cosmopolitan distribution.

Species:
 Paranais birtsteini Sokolskaya, 1971 
 Paranais botniensis Sperber, 1948

References

Naididae